Kaieteurosaurus is a genus of the lizard family Gymnophthalmidae. The genus is monotypic, i.e., it has only one species, Kaieteurosaurus hindsi. It is endemic to Guyana where it is known from the Kaieteur National Park.

Etymology
The genus name refers to the type locality, Kaieteur National Park, combined with the Greek sauros for "lizard". The specific name hindsi honors Sam Hinds, the Prime Minister of Guyana.

Ecology and description

References

Gymnophthalmidae
Monotypic lizard genera
Reptiles of Guyana
Endemic fauna of Guyana
Taxa named by Philippe J.R. Kok